Lake Wisconsin is a reservoir on the Wisconsin River in southern Wisconsin in the United States. Today it is home to the Wisconsin wine appellation of the Lake Wisconsin AVA.

It was formed by the construction of the Prairie du Sac Dam, which was begun in 1911 and completed in 1914. It is part of the Wisconsin River system of reservoirs.

Its construction effectively ended the Fox-Wisconsin Waterway connection to the Mississippi River, although commercial traffic had ended decades before completion of the dam.

The lake provides flood control and is a popular destination for recreational boating and fishing.

In 1966, the Wisconsin state record Common Carp was caught in Lake Wisconsin, weighing 57 lbs. 2 oz.

The Merrimac Ferry crosses the lake at Merrimac, Wisconsin.

Notes

External links
Aerial View-Nieting.org

Reservoirs in Wisconsin
Lakes of Columbia County, Wisconsin
Lakes of Sauk County, Wisconsin
Lake Wisconsin